The Anzac Test is an annual rugby league football test match played annually between Australia and New Zealand for the Bill Kelly Memorial Trophy.

Between 1997 and 2017 the annual test was played mid season. From 2018, the test has been played in October after the NRL season.

History

Origins
Australia and New Zealand had competed in Rugby League Tests since 1908. The Anzac Test, played on or around Anzac Day, was introduced by Super League (Australia) in 1997. When New Zealand was defeated 56–0 in 2000 the Australian Rugby League (ARL) was criticised for playing the match before the State of Origin series. The Test was then dropped from the annual schedule in favour of match in mid-July. In 2002 and 2003, Australia defeated Great Britain (64–10) and New Zealand (48–6) in July Test matches, so the test was revived the following year.

Naming controversy
The Anzac Test was controversial for its use of the term Anzac (Australian and New Zealand Army Corps) and its perceived comparison of professional sportsmen with soldiers. However Super League donated a large sum of money to the RSL, and national RSL President Bruce Ruxton featured in commercials for the inaugural Anzac Test, proclaiming

"Mark my words, Australia is still in grave danger from one of our so-called neighbours. The Kiwis were once our allies and now they're on the other side – at least for 80 minutes".

The word Anzac is protected in Australia by The Protection of Word "ANZAC" Regulations (under the War Precautions Act Repeal Act 1920) and requires permission of the Minister for Veterans' Affairs for use in commercial events. This permission was given for the event from 1997–1999.

From 2004 until 2008 the match was officially called the Bundaberg Rum League Test, after the principal sponsor, Bundaberg Rum. For the 2009 fixture, the principal sponsor was Victoria Bitter and, as such, the match was officially called the VB Test. Despite the official name change, it is still common for the match to be called the Anzac Test. In 2016 it was sponsored by the Downer Group.

Trophy
Two different trophies have been awarded for the winner of this Test. For the 1997–1999 Anzac Tests, the winner was awarded the Anzac Trophy, which depicted an Australian slouch hat and New Zealand lemon squeezer hat.

Since 2004, the winner of the Bundaberg Rum League Test has been awarded the Bill Kelly Memorial Trophy. This trophy was donated in 1996 by Gerald Ryan ONZM, a past president of the New Zealand Rugby League. It is named after Bill Kelly, a New Zealand rugby league player in the early 20th century.

The Bill Kelly Memorial Trophy was briefly stolen by three 25-year-old New Zealand men after Australia's victory in the 2006 Test. It was found several hours later on the awning of a nearby building. The trophy currently resides at the Australian Rugby League headquarters in Sydney.

In 2011, the Bill Kelly Memorial Trophy was not played for in the Anzac Test, but instead in a one-off post-season test match.

Revival after 2008 World Cup
In 2007, the New Zealand Rugby League announced that the Anzac Test would not be contested after 2008, citing difficulties with selecting their best possible team for a match held at that time of year as a number of NZ players were based in the Super League which had switched to a summer season in 1996 and clubs were reluctant to release their players for a game on the other side of the world. According to the NZRL Director of Football, Graham Lowe, "We have an obligation to play Australia in Sydney on 9 May next year, because it is their centenary test, and we will fulfil it, but that will be the last one." Although the NZRL did not think that the Anzac Tests were still a viable option, they were "optimistic an international calendar will be adopted.".

After New Zealand's win in the 2008 Rugby League World Cup, the release of new RLIF World Rankings, and the introduction of a new international schedule, the annual mid-season test between Australia and New Zealand was revived. The 2009 fixture was played on 8 May at Brisbane's Suncorp Stadium.

The 2010 Anzac Test, played on 7 May, was the first game of football at Melbourne's newly constructed AAMI Park. The 2011 Anzac Test was scheduled to be held at AMI Stadium in Christchurch on 6 May. However, the match had to be rescheduled at Robina Stadium on Australia's Gold Coast due to the 2011 Christchurch earthquake. The 2012 Anzac Test was held at Eden Park, Auckland, on 20 April and was adjudicated by English Referee, Richard Silverwood. This was the first Anzac Test to be played in New Zealand since 1998.

The 2013 Test was held at the Canberra Stadium on 19 April. This marked the first time that the Australian team had played a test in Australia's capital city. The game was played in Canberra to celebrate the centenary of that city. The 2014 Anzac Test played at the Sydney Football Stadium on 2 May, saw test football return to Sydney for the first time since the 2010 Four Nations. The 2015 Anzac Test, played at Suncorp Stadium, was originally scheduled to take place on 1 May but bad weather caused the game to be postponed to 3 May. This marked the first time a rugby league Test in Australia was ever done so. The 2016 Anzac Test was played at Hunter Stadium on 6 May, the first time the match was played in Newcastle since 2004. The Kangaroos won the match 16–0.

Demise
In August 2015 the National Rugby League (NRL) announced a new $925 million (Australian) TV deal. A key component of the deal was increased provisions promoting player welfare and satisfaction, shortening the NRL regular season from 26 weeks to 25. The traditional early-May representative weekend was removed from the calendar, with the Anzac Test disbanded. Australia-New Zealand tests and other international series will be given "new priority" in a dedicated window after the NRL season. The Pacific tests were shifted to a Sunday afternoon slot, on the same day as game 2 of the State of Origin series.

The final test was played on 5 May 2017 at the Canberra Stadium with the Kangaroos winning 30–12 in front of 18,535 fans, the lowest attendance in Anzac Test history.

Men's Test Match Results
Australia have won all but three Anzac Tests, while New Zealand have hosted only three tests.

Overall tally

 Includes the Australia (Super League) victory in 1997.

Women's Test Match Results
The Women's Anzac Test Match is the Women's rugby league version of the game and has been running since 2015.

Overall tally

See also

 Australia vs New Zealand in rugby league
 List of results of the Australian national rugby league team

References

External links
 "W(h)ither ANZAC Day? – The Legal Protection of "ANZAC", Digger History website. Retrieved 27 July 2006.
 "Fan Steals ANZAC Cup", Sydney Morning Herald. Retrieved 27 July 2006.
 "The Protection of National Icons", Advisory Council on Intellectual Property. Retrieved 27 July 2006.
 "Killing ANZAC", Digger History website. Retrieved 27 July 2006.
 "Reveller Slammed as ANZAC Cup Goes Walkabout", New Zealand Herald. Retrieved 27 July 2006.
 "NZRL move to red card Anzac tests", New Zealand Herald. Retrieved 10 June 2007.

 
Oceanian rugby league competitions
Recurring sporting events established in 1997
Nine's Wide World of Sport
Sports rivalries in Australia
Sports rivalries in New Zealand
Rugby league rivalries
1997 establishments in Australia
2017 disestablishments in Australia
Australia–New Zealand sports relations